Tony Bullimore (15 January 1939 – 31 July 2018) was a British businessman and international yachtsman. He is known especially for being rescued on 10 January 1997 during a sailing race after he had been presumed dead.

Early life and career
Born in Southend-on-Sea, Essex, he was educated at Claremont School.

Bullimore moved to Bristol in the early 1960s and married Lalel, a West Indian immigrant. In 1966 they opened the Afro-Caribbean-inspired Bamboo Club, which was billed as "Bristol's Premier West Indian Entertainment Centre", housed a restaurant, theatre workshop, football team and was the headquarters of the Bristol West Indian Cricket Club. The top floor housed the music venue, with DJs playing reggae and American soul music, and bands performed including Bob Marley and The Wailers, Jimmy Cliff, Ben E. King and Tina Turner. The club burned down in 1977, just before the Sex Pistols were due to play there. Bullimore had already opened The Granary club at Bristol's Granary building in the early 1970s, which after ten years he slowly sold off to concentrate on other business ventures. He also became a race relations advocate in Bristol.

Sailing
Bullimore was rescued after capsizing during the 1996–97 Vendée Globe single-handed around-the-world race. The race was marked by a number of incidents, including the death of another contestant, Gerry Roufs.

Bullimore was alive and managed to survive in an air pocket in the upside-down boat in pitch darkness, having lost his food supplies, aside from a bar of chocolate. The Royal Australian Navy launched a rescue mission for Bullimore and another Vendée Globe capsized competitor, Thierry Dubois. On 9 January, Dubois was rescued by an Australian S-70B-2 Seahawk helicopter embarked on the frigate .

Adelaide then proceeded further south to where the Exide Challenger had been located by a RAAF P-3 Orion. Adelaide dispatched a rigid-hulled inflatable boat to the Exide Challenger where crew members knocked on the hull. Hearing the noise, Bullimore swam out from his boat and was quickly rescued by personnel from Adelaide. HMAS Adelaide then returned both Dubois and Bullimore to Perth. During the return journey, Bullimore met with each member of the boat's crew to thank them for saving his life.

In 2000 he was featured in a BBC documentary about crossing the Atlantic Ocean, with the comedian Lenny Henry.

Bullimore skippered a team that came second in the 2005 Oryx Quest. In 2007, he was involved in another sailing record attempt.

Death
Bullimore died on 31 July 2018, aged 79, of a rare form of stomach cancer.

Bibliography
Saved, Time Warner Paperbacks, 1998, 
Rescue in the Southern Ocean, Penguin Group Australia, 1997, 
Yachting Yarns, Little, Brown Book Group Limited, 2000, .

Notes

References
"Bullimore's sister buoyed by rabbis' support", Jewish Chronicle, 24 January 1997, p. 1.
Tony Bullimore, "Ready for take off", BYM News & Magazine
Rob Sharp, "'Missing' yachtsman finally phones his wife", The Observer, 19 November 2006.

External links
 Photo Gallery of Tony Bullimore & his catamaran "Doha 2006"
 "Rescue of Tony Bullimore". YouTube.

1939 births
2018 deaths
English Jews
People from Southend-on-Sea
Businesspeople from Bristol
20th-century Royal Marines personnel
Sportspeople from Bristol
Nightclub owners
Maritime writers
English male sailors (sport)
Single-handed sailors
Deaths from stomach cancer
British male sailors (sport)
1996 Vendee Globe sailors
British Vendee Globe sailors